James Phillips (22 January 1959 – 31 July 1995) was a South African rock vocalist, songwriter, and performer. He was best known for his rebellious and satirical political music that spoke out against the South African government during Apartheid.

Biography
Phillips grew up in the conservative East Rand mining town of Springs, Gauteng in South Africa. He was the son of a Presbyterian minister. He finished high school at Witbank High in 1976.  Phillips discovered rock 'n roll and the protest music of Bob Dylan which inspired an interest in the subject. After graduating high school, he formed his first band, Corporal Punishment, with friends Carl Raubenheimer and Mark Bennet in the late 1970s. Using the lyrical brashness of the punk rock movement, without adopting the fashion, their songs often made sarcastic political statements. Lyrically, they often touched on South African topics, notably the milieu in which young, white, South African men found themselves at that time. This milieu was dominated by conscription, Calvinism, suppression of political debate, and intolerance of non-conformism.

The Corporals gained a small but fiercely loyal following. However, the lack of venues and airplay, plus their raw aggressive music meant they were either anonymous or completely ignored by the mainstream.  Despite this, Phillips never questioned whether he was doing the right thing or not, as he said, "It was just something that had to be done, someone had to sing about what was happening in South Africa".

After two years in the army, Phillips became a conscientious objector, making any chance of having a musical career even more remote.  Speaking in later years, he said, "You try and have a career as a musician when you're trying to keep your face out of the newspapers because the army is looking for you."

Also at this time, the South African government tightened control over the media, especially radio and television. In particular, songs by local musicians were often subject to heavy scrutiny before being added to radio station playlists. Censorship made record companies nervous about spending money on local artists who might make any kind of social or political comment. Some companies even ran their censorship departments that would vet songs and artists before a recording budget was assigned.  By 1980, the security forces were starting to keep an eye on any performers considered "subversive" and would spy on such performers and sometimes disrupt performances or impede careers.

Thus Phillips, along with several of his contemporaries, found himself in a position in which the prospects of a recording contract or airplay were remote. However, Corporal Punishment caught the attention of the small, independent Shifty label. Shifty had a reputation for signing groups that no other South African label would touch, but that usually meant that airplay was unlikely (almost by definition acts signed to Shifty were considered "subversive") and promotional budgets would be small.

In 1980, shifty released the EP "Fridays And Saturdays". Corporal Punishment had a recording released, but sales and exposure were negligible and the band split soon afterwards.

After the break-up of Corporal Punishment, Phillips formed a new, short-lived band called "Illegal Gathering". Then, he embarked on studies towards a bachelor's degree in music at Rhodes and then at Wits University. Then, he formed The Cherry Faced Lurchers and played songs like "Do the Lurch" or "That's my Shirt and I Want it Back". The band gained popularity when they had a residency at the then-unknown Jameson's.

Jameson's was a bar on Commissioner Street in Jo'burg's central business district. It had a Kruger liquor license – one of a small handful issued by the onetime president of the Transvaal at the turn of the 20th century, a license that transcended the racially divided and time-restricted liquor laws of the day. Young (mostly white) South Africans mixed with their counterparts of colour and everyone drank freely together. It was like the bastard child of Sophiatown. It was the new South Africa in twisted embryo.

Jameson's made The Cherry-Faced Lurchers, it was the moment at which a rather ramshackle band pulled itself together. By July 1985, when Lloyd Ross of Shifty Records put Live at Jameson's down on tape, they were an extraordinarily tight three-piece with a repertoire of songs exceptional for their strength.

As the political landscape continued to get darker as the 1980s dragged on so too did Phillips's lyrics with songs like "The Branch" (a song about the viciousness of the security police) and 'Detainees' (about the various death's in detention during the time) these songs show Phillip's anguished concerns during this time of apartheid's darkest oppression.

Away from Jameson's, Phillips was putting the finishing touches to another project under the alter ego Bernoldus Niemand, and his Wie is Bernoldus Niemand? album (1985). Targeting the monolithic Afrikaner "cultural establishment", the album was promptly banned by the SABC, although the song "Hou my vas Korporaal" would become an anthem for the anti-conscription movement. In its time it was utterly new, inspiring "alternative Afrikaner" performers like Johannes Kerkorrel and Koos Kombuis who would spearhead the Voëlvry boerepunk movement some years later. James was invited to join the Voëlvry bandwagon for a successful if the controversial, tour of the country in 1989.

  
1989 saw the controversial Voëlvry Tour which featured musicians who sang in Afrikaans and had been inspired by the Bernoldus Niemand album. Phillips and an expanded Lurchers line-up were added to the Voëlvry bill under the name "Bernoldus Niemand en die Swart Gevaar". Phillips had always regarded the Niemand alter-ego as a side project and had abandoned the songs on the Niemand album. He was now performing to the biggest audience of his career, but under another name and singing songs that he no longer considered part of his repertoire.

Phillips and the Lurchers continued to evolve and maintained a reputation as a compelling live act. By the early 1990s, Phillips was concentrating on the piano rather than the guitar and his compositions became more sophisticated. His lyrics were sometimes more personal, but other songs showed that he continued to remain relevant and vital even as South Africa moved towards democracy – a transition which had left some of Phillips's contemporaries with little to say. In 1994 he released the Sunny Skies album – recorded with an enlarged band that featured a horn section and several highly regarded guest players. Once again the album was released by Shifty, but a deal was negotiated by which BMG Music would undertake promotion and distribution. Despite BMG's efforts (allegedly hamstrung by Phillips's disinclination towards promotional work), sales remained poor. 

In the same year, Phillips stood in South Africa's first democratic election as a candidate for the eccentric Soccer Party.

Phillips summed up his optimism about the New South Africa when he said "Hopefully now we can start to like ourselves, and start to like our music".  His music now reflected his hopes for the new dispensation, and the dark and angry words of the 80s were replaced with songs of optimism like "Why Can't We (Love one another), '(I Want the World too) Start Again' and "Tabane" (a tribute to Malombo's Phillip Tabane).

During this time, his passion for the local experience did not restrict itself to music. Not only did he often spend the little money that he had on an extensive collection of first editions by local authors, he rarely missed the opening night of any locally penned play. It was perhaps this uniquely SA philosophy that allows many important actors, writers and musicians to quote him as an influence.

James Phillips was a complex human being who, at the same time as having an almost sage-like philosophical outlook, could also show naivety, and be selfish whilst showing extraordinary selflessness, often giving time and what little money he had to those in need. He drew people in; everyone was a friend of James. He lived the rock & roll lifestyle; his capacity for the jol was legendary and abstention was foreign to his nature. Despite his often arrogant and undisciplined way of approaching many aspects of his life, the legacy he leaves is that of one of the most aware, articulate and passionate artists to have been produced by South Africa.

His life ended early when he died of injuries sustained in a motorcar accident, just outside Grahamstown, where he'd been doing a series of solo concerts at the National Arts Festival.  He died never having gained recognition from the public over an important body of work. In his memorial concert a few weeks after his death, Vusi Mahlasela, Johnny Clegg, David Kramer, Lesego Rampolokeng with the Kalahari Surfers, Johannes Kerkorrel and others gathered to pay tribute to James' influence as an artist. And yet to the majority of South Africans, he remains completely unknown. He had been working on film music and television commercials with Warrick Sony (of the Kalahari Surfers) in the year before his death and seemed to find some satisfaction in applying his vast musical expertise to problem-solving in the commercial environment. His love of Beethoven was something that few people knew about but he often cited the master as an influence on his sense of light and shade.
 

IN 1995 Shifty Records released a career retrospective compilation Made in South Africa. In 1997 the same label released Soul Ou, a collection of demo tapes of mostly new songs that Phillips had planned to perform at Grahamstown in 1995. These stark, unaccompanied recordings show that Phillips was still evolving as a songwriter and player, and are regarded as some of his best work.

Discography
All titles were released on the Shifty label and now as digital downloads by Sjambokmusic 
 Fridays and Saturdays (EP) – Corporal Punishment (1980)
 Hou My Vas Korporaal b/w My Broken Heart (single) – Bernoldus Niemand (1983)
 Wie Is Bernoldus Niemand? – Bernoldus Niemand (1984)
 Live At Jamesons – The Cherry Faced Lurchers (1985)
 The Voice of Nooit – Corporal Punishment & Illegal Gathering (1986)
 The Otherwhite Album (Best of Cherry Faced Lurchers, 1985–1989) – The Cherry Faced Lurchers (1992)
 Sunny Skies – James Phillips & The Lurchers (1994)
 Made in South Africa (compilation 1978–1995) (1995)
 Soul Ou – James Phillips (1997)
 Voëlvry: Die Toer – various artists, including Bernoldus Niemand en die Swart Gevaar (2006)

See also

References

External links
Essay 
Biography

1959 births
1995 deaths
Road incident deaths in South Africa
20th-century South African male singers
South African people of British descent
People from Springs, Gauteng